Tuffite is a tuff containing both pyroclastic and detrital materials, but predominantly pyroclasts.

According to IUGS definition tuffite contains 75 to 25% volcanic (epiclastic) material.

There are several classifications that define tuffite. The classification present in the IUGS recommendation are based on the definition established by Schmid (1981). Shvetsov defined tuffites as rocks containing 50 to 90% of the volcanic fragments. Tuffite should therefore contain more than half of volcanic material. If rock contains more than 75 to 90% of pyroclastic material it is referred to as tuff. Some other, mostly older sources state that tuffite may contain 10 to 50% volcanic material.

The adjective tuffitic is used for sediments containing less than 25% volcanic fragments.

A tuffite consists of angular and/or rounded fragments of effusive rocks and their minerals, also may contain volcanic ash, pumice and clay minerals. Nonvolcanic material may consist of terrigenous, chemical precipitates or organogenic components. Quartz or mica and an admixture of carbonates, siliceous rock fragments or organic remains may be common.

References 

Volcanic rocks
Tephra